Gang Gang or gang-gang cockatoo (Callocephalon fimbriatum) is a bird found in Australia.

Gang Gang may also refer to:

Songs
"Gang Gang" (Cadet song)
"Gang Gang" (JackBoys and Sheck Wes song)
"Gang Gang" (Polo G and Lil Wayne song)
"Gang Gang" by KSI from All Over the Place
"Gang Gang" by Lil Tjay from Destined 2 Win
"Gang Gang" by Migos from Culture II
"Gang Gang" by Schoolboy Q from Crash Talk

Other uses
Ganggang, an Indianapolis, Indiana-based cultural development firm, United States
Gang Gang Dance, an American experimental music band
Gang Gang Sarah, an African witch in the folklore of Trinidad and Tobago

See also
Ganggangsullae, an ancient Korean dance